Principality of Rus' or Duchy of Rus' may refer to:

 Principality of Halychian Rus', an East Slavic medieval state, centered in Halych
 Principality of Volhynian Rus', an East Slavic medieval state, centered in Volhynia
 Principality of Halych-Volhynian Rus', an East Slavic medieval state, uniting Halych and Volhynia
 Principality of Rus' (1658), a proposed state in Eastern Europe
 Duchy of Rus' (voivodeship), a province of the early modern Kingdom of Poland (from 15th to 18th century)

See also
 Grand Principality of Rus' (disambiguation)
 Rus (disambiguation)
 Russia (disambiguation)
 Ruthenia (disambiguation)